The 2001 Pro Bowl was the NFL's all-star game for the 2000 season. The game  was played on February 4, 2001, at Aloha Stadium in Honolulu, Hawaii. The final score was AFC 38, NFC 17. Rich Gannon of the Oakland Raiders was the game's MVP.

AFC roster

Offense

Defense

Special teams

NFC roster

Offense

Defense

Special teams

Notes:
Replacement selection due to injury or vacancy
Injured player; selected but did not play
Replacement starter; selected as reserve
"Need player"; named by coach

Officials

Score

Statistics

Team Statistics

Individual statistics

Number of selections per team

References

Pro Bowl
Pro Bowl
Pro Bowl
Pro Bowl
Pro Bowl
American football competitions in Honolulu
February 2001 sports events in the United States